The women's singles wheelchair tennis tournament at the 2016 Paralympic Games in Rio de Janeiro was held at the Olympic Tennis Centre in the Barra Olympic Park in Barra da Tijuca in the west zone of Rio de Janeiro, Brazil from 10 to 15 September 2016.

Netherlands' domination of women's singles in wheelchair tennis was extended to a seventh successive Games, as Jiske Griffioen became the fifth different Dutch winner of the event, following the retirement of four-time winner Esther Vergeer following one of the longest unbeaten runs in sport. Indeed, the final was an all-Dutch affair, with the silver going to Aniek van Koot. Japanese player Yui Kamiji managed to prevent an all-Dutch podium, winning in the bronze medal playoff against the Netherlands' Diede de Groot.

Final rounds

Preliminary rounds

Section 1

Section 2

Section 3

Section 4

References

Women's singles